Norway competed in the Eurovision Song Contest 1999, represented by Stig van Eijk with the song "Living My Life Without You". The song was chosen as the Norwegian entry after winning the Melodi Grand Prix 1999 contest.

Before Eurovision

Melodi Grand Prix 1999 
Melodi Grand Prix 1999 was the Norwegian national final that selected Norway's entry for the Eurovision Song Contest 1999.

Competing entries 
Composers were directly invited by NRK to submit songs for the competition. The composers both created the song and selected the performer for their entry. For the first time, all competing entries were performed in the English language.

Final 
The final took place on 27 February 1999 at the Studio 2 of NRK, hosted by Øystein Bache and Rune Gokstad. The winner was selected by a combination of regional televoting and a jury panel. The results of the public televote were revealed by Norway's five regions, with the televoting figures of each region being converted to points. The top six songs received 1, 2, 3, 5, 7 and 10 points. The jury panel had a weighting equal to the votes of two televoting regions. The jury consisted of Rolf Løvland, Gunilla Holm Platou, Jorun Erdal, Erik Nodland and Anders Rogg.

At Eurovision
On the night of Eurovision, held on 29 May in Jerusalem, Stig van Eijk performed "Living My Life Without You" eighth in the running order, following Turkey and preceding Denmark. At the close of the voting, Stig had received 35 points, placing 14th in a field of 23.

Voting

References

External links
Norwegian National Final 1999

1999
Countries in the Eurovision Song Contest 1999
1999
Eurovision
Eurovision